"Say a Prayer" is a dance-pop and house song by American vocalist Taylor Dayne, taken from her third studio album, Soul Dancing (1993). It was written by Dayne, Shep Pettibone and Tony Shimkin, produced by Pettibone. In 1995, the song was remixed for her compilation album, Greatest Hits and was release that same year by Arista Records.

Single
Taylor did not record any new tracks for her Greatest Hits release. Arista instead released a remixed version of the song as the first single in 1995.

Charts
The song was a hit in the club scenes, peaking at No. 5 on the Hot Dance Music/Club Play chart. It peaked at #58 on the UK Singles Chart.

CD single remixes 
The following are the different remixes included on the U.S. release:

Boss Club Mix – 7:48
Vission Lorimer Remix – 6:28
Boss Dub Mix – 6:56
Vission Lorimer Dub – 5:32
Mass Dub – 6:44

1993 songs
1995 songs
1995 singles
Arista Records singles
Taylor Dayne songs
Dance-pop songs
House music songs
Songs written by Shep Pettibone
Songs written by Taylor Dayne
Song recordings produced by Shep Pettibone